The Caribbean Lowlands are a plains region along eastern areas of Central American nations. The area is usually between mountain ranges and the coastlines of the Caribbean Sea.

Geography
The lowlands are mainly between the major American Cordillera System ranges running down the center of the Central American Isthmus and the Caribbean coasts.

In some areas of Central America, such as northern Honduras and Panama, the Caribbean Lowlands are narrow to non-existent. In other areas, such as Nicaragua and eastern Honduras, the lowlands expand into the plains of the Mosquito Coast. Wide coastal plains are also found further north along the Caribbean in Belize.

Ecology

The lowlands habitats and plant communities are in Neotropic ecoregions

See also

References

Regions of Central America
Ecoregions of Central America
Geography of Central America
Landforms of Central America
Plains of North America
Geography of Belize
Geography of Guatemala
Geography of Honduras
Geography of Nicaragua
Geography of Panama
Caribbean Sea
Coasts of the Atlantic Ocean
Regions of the Caribbean
Neotropical ecoregions